Plinthocoelium domingoense is a species of beetle in the family Cerambycidae. It was described by Fisher in 1922.

References

Callichromatini
Beetles described in 1922